The 2014 Winter Olympics, officially called the XXII Olympic Winter Games and commonly known as Sochi 2014, was an international winter multi-sport event that was held from 7 to 23 February 2014 in Sochi, Russia. Opening rounds in certain events were held on 6 February 2014, the day before the opening ceremony.

These were the first Olympic Games under the International Olympic Committee (IOC) presidency of Thomas Bach. Both the Olympics and Paralympics were organized by the Sochi Organizing Committee (SOOC). Sochi was selected as the host city in July 2007, during the 119th IOC Session held in Guatemala City. It was the first Olympics to be held in a CIS state after the breakup of the Soviet Union in 1991. The Soviet Union was previously the host nation for the 1980 Summer Olympics in Moscow.

A record ninety-eight events in fifteen winter sport disciplines were held during the Games. A number of new competitions—a total of twelve accounting for gender—were held during the Games, including biathlon mixed relay, women's ski jumping, mixed-team figure skating, mixed-team luge, half-pipe skiing, ski and snowboard slopestyle, and snowboard parallel slalom. The events were held around two clusters of new venues: an Olympic Park constructed in Sochi's Imeretinsky Valley on the coast of the Black Sea, with Fisht Olympic Stadium, and the Games' indoor venues located within walking distance; and snow events in the resort settlement of Krasnaya Polyana.

The 2014 Winter Olympics were the most expensive Games in the history of the Olympics. While originally budgeted at US$12 billion, major cost overruns caused this figure to expand to US$51 billion, more than three times the cost of the 2012 London Olympics and even surpassing the estimated cost of US$44 billion for the 2008 Summer Olympics in Beijing. The 2014 Games achieved a record broadcast audience of 2.1 billion people worldwide.

In 2016, an independent report commissioned by the World Anti-Doping Agency confirmed allegations that the Russian Olympic team had been involved in a state-sponsored doping program, active from at least late-2011 through August 2015. The program was active during the Winter Olympics in Sochi, and athletes had benefited from the cover-up. The IOC stripped thirteen medals from Russian athletes in 2017, but nine were reinstated by the Court of Arbitration for Sport. In December 2017, the IOC voted to suspend the Russian Olympic Committee, with an option for whitelisted athletes to compete independently during the 2018 Winter Olympics.

Bidding process

Sochi was elected on 4 July 2007 during the 119th International Olympic Committee (IOC) session held in Guatemala City, Guatemala, defeating bids from Salzburg, Austria; and Pyeongchang, South Korea. This is the first time that the Russian Federation has hosted the Winter Olympics. The Soviet Union was the host of the 1980 Summer Olympics held in and around Moscow.

Cost and financing

As of October 2013, the estimated combined cost of the 2014 Winter Olympics had topped US$51 billion. This amount included the cost for Olympic games themselves and cost of Sochi infrastructural projects (roads, railroads, power plants). This total is over four times the initial budget of $12 billion (compared to the $8 billion spent for the 2010 Winter Olympics in Vancouver), and made the Sochi games the most expensive Olympics in history, exceeding the estimated $44 billion cost of the 2008 Summer Olympics in Beijing, which hosted 3 times as many events. Dmitry Kozak was the main overseer for the events in Sochi.

In its final budget published in June 2014, Olimpstroy—the state corporation that oversaw the Sochi Olympics development—reported the total allocated funds for the 2014 Sochi Winter Olympics of 1,524 billion rubles (US$49.5 billion). However, only about a fifth of that budget ($10.8 billion) was directly related to the Olympic games, while the rest went into urban and regional regeneration and the conversion of the Sochi region into an all-year round sea and alpine resort. The breakdown table below is based on a report that has analyzed the distribution of Olimpstroy's $49.5 billion budget. Estimates also suggest that additional unrecoverable operational costs (including for security) could have added another $3 billion.

The breakdown of the 2014 Sochi Winter Olympics costs

Venues

Sochi 2014 is the 12th straight Olympics to outlaw smoking; all Sochi venues, Olympic Park bars and restaurants and public areas were smoke-free during the Games. It is also the first time that an Olympic Park has been built for hosting winter games.

Sochi Olympic Park (Coastal Cluster)

The Sochi Olympic Park was built by the Black Sea coast in the Imeretinsky Valley, about 4 km (2.5 miles) from Russia's border with Abkhazia/Georgia. The venues were clustered around a central water basin on which the Medals Plaza is built, allowing all indoor venues to be within walking distance. It also features "The Waters of the Olympic Park" (designed by California-based company WET), a choreographed fountain which served as the backdrop in the medals awards and the opening and closing ceremonies of the event. The new venues include:
 Fisht Olympic Stadium – ceremonies (opening/closing) 40,000 spectators
 Bolshoy Ice Dome – ice hockey (final), 12,000 spectators
 Shayba Arena – ice hockey, 7,000 spectators
 Adler Arena Skating Center – speed skating, 8,000 spectators
 Iceberg Skating Palace – figure skating, short track speed skating, 12,000 spectators
 Ice Cube Curling Center – curling, 3,000 spectators
 Main Olympic village
 International broadcasting centre and main press room

Krasnaya Polyana (Mountain Cluster)

 Laura Biathlon & Ski Complex – biathlon, cross-country skiing
 Rosa Khutor Extreme Park – freestyle skiing and snowboarding
 Rosa Khutor Alpine Resort – alpine skiing
 Sliding Center Sanki – bobsleigh, luge and skeleton
 RusSki Gorki Jumping Center – ski jumping and Nordic combined (both ski jumping and cross-country skiing on a 2 km route around the arena)
 Roza Khutor plateau Olympic Village

Post-Olympic usage

A street circuit known as the Sochi Autodrom was constructed in and around Olympic Park. Its primary use is to host the Formula One Russian Grand Prix, which held its inaugural edition in October 2014.

In January 2015, work began on adapting Fisht Olympic Stadium into an open-air football stadium to host matches during the 2018 FIFA World Cup.

A new ice hockey team in the Kontinental Hockey League, HC Sochi Leopards, now plays in Bolshoy Arena.

Marketing

Construction

The Olympic infrastructure was constructed according to a Federal Target Program (FTP). In June 2009, the Games' organizers reported they were one year ahead in building the main Olympic facilities as compared to recent Olympic Games. In November 2011, IOC President Jacques Rogge was in Sochi and concluded that the city had made significant progress since he last visited eighteen months earlier.

Telecommunications

According to the FTP, US$580 million would be spent on construction and modernization of telecommunications in the region. Avaya was named by the Sochi Organizing Committee as the official supplier of telecommunications equipment. Avaya provided the data network equipment, including switches, routers, security, telephones and contact-center systems. It provided engineers and technicians to design and test the systems, and worked with other technology partners to provide athletes, dignitaries and fans information about the Games.

The 2014 Olympics is the first "fabric-enabled" Games using Shortest Path Bridging (SPB) technology. The network is capable of handling up to 54 Tbit/s of traffic.

Infrastructure built for the games included:
 A network of TETRA mobile radio communications for 100 user groups (with capacity of 10,000 subscribers);
  of fiber-optic cables along the Anapa-Dzhubga-Sochi highways and Dzhubga–Krasnodar branch;
 Digital broadcasting infrastructure, including radio and television broadcasting stations (building and communications towers) with coverage from Grushevaya Polyana (Pear Glade) to Sochi and Anapa cities. The project also included construction of infocommunications centre for broadcasting abroad via three HDTV satellites.

During the Games, the core networks of Rostelecom and Transtelekom were used.

In January 2012, the newest equipment for the television coverage of the Games arrived in the port of Adler. Prepared specifically for the Games, a team of regional specialists and the latest technology provide a qualitatively new level of television production in the region.

The fiber-optic channel links Sochi between Adler and Krasnaya Polyana. The  channel enables videoconferencing and news reporting from the Olympics.

In November 2013, it was reported that the fiber-optic cable that was built by the Federal Communications Agency, Rossvyaz, had no operator. With Rostelecom and Megafon both refusing to operate it, the line was transferred to the ownership of the state enterprise Center for Monitoring & Development of Infocommunication Technologies.

Russian mobile phone operator Megafon expanded and improved Sochi's telecom infrastructure with over 700 new 2G/3G/4G cell towers. Sochi was the first Games to offer 4G connectivity at a speed of 10 MB/sec.

In January 2014, Rostelecom reported that it had connected the Olympic media center in Sochi to the Internet and organized channels of communication with the main media center of the Olympic Games in the coastal cluster and press center in Moscow. The media center was built at total cost of 17 million rubles.

Power infrastructure

A five-year strategy for increasing the power supply of the Sochi region was presented by Russian energy experts during a seminar on 29 May 2009, held by the Sochi 2014 Organizing Committee, and attended by International Olympic Committee (IOC) experts and officials from the Russian Ministry of Regional Development, the Russian Ministry of Energy, the State Corporation Olimpstroy and the Krasnodar Krai administration.

According to the strategy, the capacity of the regional energy network would increase by two and a half times by 2014, guaranteeing a stable power supply during and after the Games.

The power demand of Sochi at the end of May 2009 was 424 MW. The power demand of the Olympic infrastructure was expected to be about 340 MW.
 Poselkovaya electrical substation became operational in early 2009.
 Sochi thermal power station reconstructed (expected power output was 160 MW)
 Laura and Rosa Khutor electrical substations were completed in November 2010
 Mzymta electrical substation was completed in March 2011
 Krasnopolyanskaya hydroelectric power station was completed in 2010
 Adler CHP station design and construction was completed in 2012. Expected power output was 360 MW
 Bytkha substation, under construction with two transformers 25 MW each, includes dependable microprocessor-based protection

Earlier plans also include building combined cycle (steam and gas) power stations near the cities of Tuapse and Novorossiysk and construction of a cable-wire powerline, partially on the floor of the Black Sea.

Transportation

The transport infrastructure prepared to support the Olympics includes many roads, tunnels, bridges, interchanges, railroads and stations in and around Sochi. Among others, 8 flyovers, 102 bridges, tens of tunnels and a bypass route for heavy trucks –  of roads were paved.

The Sochi Light Metro is located between Adler and Krasnaya Polyana connecting the Olympic Park, Sochi International Airport, and the venues in Krasnaya Polyana.

The existing , Tuapse-to-Adler railroad was renovated to provide double track throughout, increasing capacity and enabling a reliable regional service to be provided and extending to the airport. In December 2009, Russian Railways ordered 38 Siemens Mobility Desiro trains for delivery in 2013 for use during the Olympics, with an option for a further 16 partly built in Russia.

At Sochi International Airport, a new terminal was built along a  runway extension, overlapping the Mzymta River.

At the Port of Sochi, a new offshore terminal  from the shore allows docking for cruise ships with capacities of 3,000 passengers. The cargo terminal of the seaport would be moved from the centre of Sochi.

Roadways were detoured, some going around the construction site and others being cut off.

In May 2009, Russian Railways started the construction of tunnel complex No. 1 (the final total is six) on the combined road (automobile and railway) from Adler to Alpica Service Mountain Resort in the Krasnaya Polyana region. The tunnel complex No. 1 is located near Akhshtyr in Adlersky City District, and includes:
 Escape tunnel, completed in 2010
 Road tunnel, completed in 2013
 One-track railway tunnel, completed in 2013

Russian Railways president Vladimir Yakunin stated the road construction costed more than 200 billion rubles.

In addition, Sochi's railway stations were renovated. These are Dagomys, Sochi, Matsesta, Khosta, Lazarevskaya, and Loo railway stations. In Adler, a new railway station was built while the original building was preserved, and in the Olympic park cluster, a new station was built from scratch, the Olympic Park railway station. Another new railway station was built in Estosadok, close to Krasnaya Polyana.

Other infrastructure

Funds were spent on the construction of hotels for 10,300 guests. The first of the Olympic hotels, Zvezdny (Stellar), was rebuilt anew. Significant funds were spent on the construction of an advanced sewage treatment system in Sochi, designed by Olimpstroy. The system meets BREF standards and employs top available technologies for environment protection, including tertiary treatment with microfiltration.

Six post offices were opened at competition venues, two of them in the main media centre in Olympic Park and in the mountain village of Estosadok. In addition to standard services, customers had access to unique services including two new products, Fotomarka and Retropismo. Fotomarka presents an opportunity to get a stylized sheet of eight souvenir stamps with one's own photos, using the services of a photographer in the office. Retropismo service allows a customer to write with their own stylus or pen on antique paper with further letters, winding string and wax seal affixing. All the new sites and post offices in Sochi were opened during the Olympics until late night 7 days a week, and employees were trained to speak English.

The Games

Torch relay

On 29 September 2013, the Olympic torch was lit in Ancient Olympia, beginning a seven-day journey across Greece and on to Russia, then the torch relay started at Moscow on 7 October 2013 before passing 83 Russian cities and arriving at Sochi on the day of the opening ceremony, 7 February 2014. It is the longest torch relay in Olympic history, a  route that passes through all regions of the country, from Kaliningrad in the west to Chukotka in the east.

The Olympic torch reached the North Pole for first time via a nuclear-powered icebreaker (50 Let Pobedy). The torch was also passed for the first time in space, though not lit for the duration of the flight for safety reasons, on flight Soyuz TMA-11M to the International Space Station (ISS). The spacecraft itself was adorned with Olympic-themed livery including the Games' emblem. Russian cosmonauts Oleg Kotov and Sergey Ryazansky waved the torch on a spacewalk outside the ISS. The torch returned to Earth five days later on board Soyuz TMA-09M. The torch also reached Europe's highest mountain, Mount Elbrus, and Siberia's Lake Baikal.

Opening ceremony

The opening ceremony of the 2014 Winter Olympics was held on 7 February 2014 at Fisht Olympic Stadium, an indoor arena built specifically for the ceremonies. The ceremony featured scenes based around aspects of Russian history and arts, including ballet, classical music, the Russian Revolution, and the age of the Soviet Union. The opening scene of the ceremony featured a notable technical error, where one of five snowflakes, which were to expand to form the Olympic rings, malfunctioned and did not expand (a mishap mocked by the organizers at the closing ceremony where one of the roundrelay dance groups symbolizing the Olympic rings "failed" to expand). The torch was taken into the stadium by Maria Sharapova, who then passed it to Yelena Isinbayeva who, in turn, passed it to wrestler Aleksandr Karelin. Karelin then passed the torch to gymnast Alina Kabaeva. Figure skater Irina Rodnina took the torch and was met by former ice hockey goalkeeper Vladislav Tretiak, who exited the stadium to jointly light the Olympic cauldron located near the center of Olympic Park.

Participating National Olympic Committees
A record 88 nations qualified to compete, which beat the previous record of 82 set at the previous Winter Olympics in Vancouver. The number of athletes who qualified per country is listed in the table below (number of athletes shown in parentheses). Seven nations made their Winter Olympics debut: Dominica, Malta, Paraguay, Timor-Leste, Togo, Tonga, and Zimbabwe. The Winter debut of Malta meant that for the first time ever, all of the current members of the European Olympic Committees participated at the Winter Olympics.

Kristina Krone qualified to compete in her second consecutive games for Puerto Rico, but the island's Olympic Committee once again chose not to send her to compete. Similarly, South Africa decided not to send alpine skier Sive Speelman to Sochi. Algeria also did not enter its only qualified athlete, Mehdi-Selim Khelifi.

India's athletes originally competed as Independent Olympic Participants and marched under the Olympic flag during the opening ceremony, as India was originally suspended in December 2012 over the election process of the Indian Olympic Association. On 11 February, the Indian Olympic Association was reinstated and India's athletes were allowed the option to compete under their own flag from that time onward. Although Shiva Keshavan competed as an Independent athlete and is recorded as such, he was permitted to walk under the flag of India at the Closing Ceremony.

National houses
During the Games some countries had a national house, a meeting place for supporters, athletes and other followers. Houses could be either free for visitors to access or have limited access by invitation only.

Sports
The 2014 Winter Olympics featured 98 events over 15 disciplines in 7 sports. A total of twelve new events were contested, making it the largest Winter Olympics to date.

 Biathlon
 
 Bobsleigh
 
 
 Curling
 
 Ice hockey
 
 Luge
 
 Skating
 
 
 
 Skiing
 
 
 
 
 
 

Numbers in parentheses indicate the number of medal events contested in each separate discipline.

New events 

On 6 April 2011, the IOC accepted a number of events that were submitted by their respective sports federations to be considered for inclusion into the official program of these Olympic Games.
The events included a Figure skating team event, Women's ski jumping, Mixed relay biathlon, Ski half-pipe, and Team relay luge.

On 4 July 2011, the IOC announced that three events would be added to the program. These events, which were officially declared by Olympic Committee President Jacques Rogge on 4 July 2011, were: Ski slopestyle, Snowboard slopestyle, Snowboard parallel special slalom.

Team alpine skiing was also presented as a candidate for inclusion in the Olympic program but the Executive board of the IOC rejected this proposal. The International Ski Federation persisted with the nomination and this was considered. There were reports of bandy possibly being added to the sports program, but the IOC rejected this request. Subsequently, the international governing body, Federation of International Bandy, decided that Irkutsk and Shelekhov in Russia would host the 2014 Bandy World Championship just before the Olympics.

On 28 November 2006, the Executive Board of the IOC decided not to include ski mountaineering, ski-orienteering, or winter triathlon in the review process of the program.

Closing ceremony

The closing ceremony was held on 23 February 2014 between 20:14 MSK (UTC+4) and 22:25 MSK (UTC+4) at the Fisht Olympic Stadium in Sochi.
The ceremony was dedicated to Russian culture featuring world-renowned Russian stars like conductor and violinist Yuri Bashmet, conductor Valery Gergiev, pianist Denis Matsuev, singer Hibla Gerzmava and violinist Tatiana Samouil. These artists were joined by performers from the Bolshoi and Mariinsky theaters.

Medals

Sochi's medal design was unveiled in May 2013. The design is intended to resemble Sochi's landscape, with a semi-translucent section containing a "patchwork quilt" of diamonds representing mountains; the diamonds themselves contain designs that reflect Russia's regions. Those who won gold medals on 15 February received special medals with fragments of the Chelyabinsk meteor, marking the one-year anniversary of the event where pieces of the cosmic body fell into the Chebarkul Lake in the Ural Mountains in central Russia.

Medal table

The top ten listed NOCs by number of gold medals are listed below. The host nation, Russia, is highlighted.

Podium sweeps

 Legkov and Vylegzhanin were initially disqualified by the IOC for doping offenses in November 2017, and their 2014 Olympic medals were stripped (gold and silver respectively). However, their results were restored on 1 February 2018 following a successful appeal.

Calendar

Security

Measures
Security during both the Olympics and Paralympics were handled by over 40,000 law enforcement officials, including police and the Russian Armed Forces. A presidential decree signed by President Vladimir Putin took effect on 7 January, requiring that any protests and demonstrations in Sochi and the surrounding area through 21 March (the end of the Paralympics) be approved by the Federal Security Service. For the duration of the decree, travel restrictions were also in effect in and around Sochi: "controlled" zones, dubbed the "ring of steel" by the media, covered the Coastal and Mountain clusters which encompass all of the Games' venues and infrastructure, including transport hubs such as railway stations. To enter controlled areas, visitors were required to pass through security checkpoints with X-ray machines, metal detectors and explosive material scanners. Several areas were designated as "forbidden", including Sochi National Park and the border with Abkhazia. An unmanned aerial vehicle squadron, along with S-400 and Pantsir-S1 air defense rockets were used to protect Olympic airspace. Four gunboats were also deployed on the Black Sea to protect the coastline.

A number of security organizations and forces began stationing in and around Sochi in January 2014; Russia's Ministry of Emergency Situations (EMERCOM) was stationed in Sochi for the Games beginning on 7 January 2014. A group of 10,000 Internal Troops of the Ministry of Interior also provided security services during the Games. In mid-January, 1,500 Siberian Regional Command troops were stationed in a military town near Krasnaya Polyana. A group of 400 Cossacks in traditional uniforms were also present to accompany police patrols. The 58th Army unit of the Russian Armed Forces were defending the Georgia–Russia border. The United States also supplied Navy ships and other assets for security purposes.

All communication and Internet traffic by Sochi residents was captured and filtered through deep packet inspection systems at all mobile networks using the SORM system.

Former professional speed skater and current deputy of the Russian State Duma Svetlana Zhurova has stated that the 2014 Sochi Olympics were Vladimir Putin's personal project to showcase Russia to the world.

Incidents and threats
Organizers received several threats prior to the Games. In a July 2013 video release, Chechen Islamist commander Dokka Umarov called for attacks on the Games, stating that the Games were being staged "on the bones of many, many Muslims killed ... and buried on our lands extending to the Red Sea".

Threats were received from the group Vilayat Dagestan, which had claimed responsibility for the Volgograd bombings under the demands of Umarov, and a number of National Olympic Committees had also received threats via e-mail, threatening that terrorists would kidnap or "blow up" athletes during the Games. However, while the IOC did state that the letters "[contained] no threat and appears to be a random message from a member of the public", the U.S. ski and snowboarding teams hired a private security agency to provide additional protection during the Games.

Media

Broadcasting rights

In most regions, broadcast rights to the 2014 Winter Olympics were packaged together with broadcast rights for the 2016 Summer Olympics, but some broadcasters obtained rights to further games as well. Domestic broadcast rights were sold by Sportfive to a consortium of three Russian broadcasters: Channel One, VGTRK, and NTV Plus.

In the United States, the 2014 Winter Olympics were the first in a new, US$4.38 billion contract with NBCUniversal, extending its broadcast rights to the Olympic Games through 2020.

In Canada, after losing the 2010 and 2012 Games to Bell Media and Rogers Media, the Canadian Broadcasting Corporation re-gained broadcast rights to the Olympics for the first time since 2008, gaining rights to the 2014 and 2016 Games. Bell and Rogers sub-licensed pay-TV rights for their TSN, Sportsnet and Réseau des sports networks, as well as TVA Group's TVA Sports.

In Australia, after all three major commercial networks pulled out of bidding on rights to both the 2014 and 2016 Games due to cost concerns, the IOC awarded broadcast rights to just the 2014 Winter Olympics to Network Ten for A$20 million.

Filming
Several broadcasters used the Games to trial the emerging ultra high definition television (UHDTV) standard. Both NTV Plus and Comcast filmed portions of the Games in 4K resolution; Comcast offered its content through smart TV apps, while NTV+ held public and cinema viewings of the content. NHK filmed portions of the Games in 8K resolution for public viewing. Olympic sponsor Panasonic filmed the opening ceremony in 4K.

Concerns and controversies

A variety of concerns over the Games, or Russia's hosting of the Games, had been expressed by various entities. Concerns were shown over Russia's policies surrounding the LGBT community, including the government's denial of a proposed Pride House for the Games on moral grounds, and a federal law passed in June 2013 which criminalized the distribution of "propaganda of non-traditional sexual relationships" among minors. Severe cost overruns made the 2014 Winter Olympics the most expensive Olympics in history, with Russian politician Boris Nemtsov citing allegations of corruption among government officials, and Allison Stewart of the Saïd Business School at the University of Oxford citing tight relationships between the government and construction firms. It was reported that Putin's annexation of Crimea may have been intended to distract local Russians from corruption stories related to the Games.

U.S. broadcaster NBC largely avoided broadcasting material critical of Russia, although several segments deemed "overly friendly to Russia" were criticized by some commentators.

Following the closing ceremony, commentators evaluated the Games to have been successful overall.

Circassian genocide 

Some Circassian organizations objected to the Games being held on land their ancestors held until 1864, when most of them were vanquished at the end of the Russian-Circassian War (1763–1864), in the Circassian genocide The use of Krasnaya Polyana ("Red Hill" or "Red Glade") as an event site was considered insensitive, as it was named for a group of Circassians who were defeated in a bloody battle with Russians while attempting to return home over it in 1864. Some Circassian groups demanded that the Games be cancelled or moved unless Russia apologized for their actions. Other groups did not outright object to the Games, but suggested that symbols of Circassian history and culture be incorporated into the Games, as Australia, the United States and Canada did for their indigenous cultures in 2000, 2002, and 2010 respectively.

Russian doping scandal

Following the Games, reports began to emerge that the Russian Olympic team had participated in a state-run doping program, which supplied their athletes with performance-enhancing drugs. These allegations first emerged in a December 2014 documentary by German public broadcaster ARD, and were detailed further in a May 2016 report by The New York Times—which published allegations by Dr. Grigory Rodchenkov, the former director of Russia's anti-doping laboratory. Rodchenkov alleged that a conspiracy of corrupt anti-doping officials, FSB intelligence agents, and compliant Russian athletes used banned substances to gain an unfair advantage during the Games. Rodchenkov stated that the FSB tampered with over 100 urine samples as part of a cover-up, and that at least fifteen of the Russian medals won in Sochi were the result of doping.

The World Anti-Doping Agency (WADA) commissioned an independent report by Richard McLaren, which corroborated claims that Russian authorities had been discreetly swapping out urine samples that tested positive for performance-enhancing substances. The report concluded that the program had been operating from "at least late 2011 to August 2015", and had covered up 643 positive samples across Olympic and non-Olympic sports. As a result, WADA considered the Russian Anti-Doping Agency to be non-compliant with the World Anti-Doping Code, and recommended that Russia be banned from competing in the 2016 Summer Olympics.

Russia was not banned from the 2016 Olympics by the IOC, a decision that was widely criticized by both athletes and writers; the IOC only required Russia's athletes to be cleared by an internal panel and their respective sports federations. The IAAF had suspended Russia from international track and field events due to the scandal, but did allow Darya Klishina to participate in the Olympics because she was confirmed not to be a part of a doping program, despite claims that surfaced in her appeal that a sample of Klishina's that had been collected on 26 February 2014 had yielded an illegal testosterone/epitestosterone ratio of 8.5 had been subject
to a "SAVE" order by the Ministry of Sport on 3 March 2014. The International Paralympic Committee suspended the Russian Paralympic Committee and banned the team from the 2016 Summer Paralympics.

On 5 December 2017, the IOC voted to suspend the Russian Olympic Committee, thus banning it from sending athletes under the Russian flag to the 2018 Winter Olympics. Cleared Russian athletes were allowed to participate as "Olympic Athletes from Russia" (OAR). Two of them – curler Alexander Krushelnitskiy, who won a bronze medal, and bobsledder Nadezhda Sergeeva – failed drug tests during the Games.

The IOC's Oswald Commission disqualified and banned 43 Russian athletes, and stripped thirteen medals they earned in Sochi. In December 2017, 42 of the 43 punished athletes appealed to the Court of Arbitration for Sport (CAS). On 1 February 2018, the CAS found that the IOC provided insufficient evidence and cleared 28 athletes from IOC sanctions. In total, Russian athletes won back 9 of the 13 medals collected. For 11 other athletes, the CAS decided that there was sufficient evidence to uphold their Sochi sanctions, but reduced their lifetime bans to only the 2018 Winter Olympics. The IOC said in a statement that "the result of the CAS decision does not mean that athletes from the group of 28 will be invited to the [2018 Winter Olympic] Games. Not being sanctioned does not automatically confer the privilege of an invitation" and that "this [case] may have a serious impact on the future fight against doping". The IOC found it important to note that the CAS Secretary General "insisted that the CAS decision does not mean that these 28 athletes are innocent” and that they would consider an appeal against the court's decision. Later that month, the Russian Olympic Committee was reinstated by the IOC, despite failed doping tests during the 2018 Olympics, and the Russian Anti-Doping Agency was re-certified in September, despite the Russian officials not accepting the McLaren report.

See also 

 2014 Winter Paralympics
 2014 Summer Youth Olympics

References

External links 

 
 
 Olympstroy State Corporation  - responsible for Sochi Olympics construction and development
 Sochi 2014 links on Open Directory Project (DMOZ)
 Sochi satellite image on Google Maps

2014 Winter Olympics
Olympics
2014 in multi-sport events
2014 in Russian sport
Olympic Games in Russia
Sports competitions in Sochi
2014
Articles containing video clips
February 2014 sports events in Russia
Winter multi-sport events in Russia
21st century in Sochi
Doping in Russia